Lepidolacipa is a monotypic moth genus in the subfamily Lymantriinae. Its only species, Lepidolacipa venosata, is found in Malawi. Both the genus and the species were first described by Hering in 1926.

References

Endemic fauna of Malawi
Lymantriinae
Monotypic moth genera